Eero Laine (7 January 1926 – 23 October 1998) was a Finnish biathlete. He competed in the 20 km individual event at the 1960 Winter Olympics.

References

External links
 

1926 births
1998 deaths
Finnish male biathletes
Olympic biathletes of Finland
Biathletes at the 1960 Winter Olympics
People from Tammela, Finland
Sportspeople from Kanta-Häme